The Calcareous Grit is a geologic formation in England. It preserves fossils dating back to the Jurassic period.

See also

 List of fossiliferous stratigraphic units in England

References
 

Jurassic England